This is a list of television programs which have aired on the Canadian television channel OUTtv. Note that the purpose of this list is to be a comprehensive reference for all programs which have ever aired on the network; shows are not removed from the list below on the basis that they're no longer airing.

0-9
 1 Girl 5 Gays

A
 The A-List: Dallas
 The A-List: New York
 Absolutely Fabulous
 The Afterlife with Suzane Northrop
 Alan Carr: Chatty Man
 Alan Carr: Tooth Fairy Live
 Ask Dr. Keith
 Avocado Toast

B
 Bad Girls
 Banana
 Baroness von Sketch Show
 Beautiful People
 Because I Said So
 Behind the Bar
 Beverly Hills Fabulous
 The Big Bow Wow
 Big Freedia: Queen of Bounce
 Birch & Co.
 The Boulet Brothers' Dragula
 BoysTown
 Breaker High 
 Brideshead Revisited
 The Browns
 Bump!

C
 Call Me Mother
 Cam Boy
 Canada's Drag Race
 The Canadian Travel Show
 Candy Bar Girls
 Cannonball
 Chasing Spring
 Chatty Man Christmas
 Cherry Bomb
 Choccywoccydoodah
 Chris & John to the Rescue!
 Chris & John's Halloween Superstar!
 Chris & John's Road Trip!
 Closeted Hollywood
 Colin and Justin's Cabin Pressure
 Colin and Justin's Home Heist
 Coming Out Stories
 Conchita - Queen of Austria
 Conchita - Unstoppable
 Country Dreams
 COVERguy
 Cucumber
 Curl Girls

D
 The Dame Edna Experience
 Dame Edna Live at the Palace
 Dante's Cove
 Dating Unlocked
 David Bowie - Five Years
 David Bowie - Love You Till Tuesday
 Degrassi: The Next Generation
 Del Shores - My Sordid Life
 Designer Travel
 Discovering Elton John
 Discovering Queen
 Dish!
 The DL Chronicles
 Dolly Parton - Song by Song
 Dolly Parton Live @Glastonbury
 The Donald Strachey Mysteries
 Don't Quit Your Gay Job
 Dr. Barry
 Dr. Terrible's House of Horrible
 Drag Heals
 Drag Queens of London
 Drag Race Canada
 DTLA
 DTLA After Dark
 Dyke TV

E
El Mundo Del Lundo
Elite Model Look 
Elton John - Million Dollar Piano
 Elvira Kurt: Adventures in Comedy
 End of Second Class
Entrée to Asia
Eros
Eurovision Song Contest 2014
Eurovision Song Contest 2015
Exes and Ohs
Eyewitness
Ezra

F
Fabulocity
The Face of Furry Creek
Face to Face with David
Fairy Tale
Fak Yaass
Fatherhood Dreams
Favourite Places
Finding Prince Charming
Freddie Mercury: The Great Pretender
Freefall
From Katya With Love
For the Boys TV!
F*cking Smart

G
The G Factor
Gauntlet of Gaymes
The Gavin Crawford Show
Gay Army
Gay for Play
Gay Getaways
Gay News Network
The Gayest Show Ever
Get Up & Grow
Gimme Gimme Gimme
Girls on Top
Glee
Gone
GoGo for the Gold
Goodness Gracious Me
The Goods
Got 2B There
The Graham Norton Effect
Group Sext

H
He's Fit
Heading Out
Hey Qween!
The High Life
Hit & Miss
Homorazzi
Hot Gay Comics
Hot Haus
Hot Pink Shorts
House of Drag
House of Venus Show
How Far Will You Go?
The Hunks

I
I Do?
Iconic Justice
Identities
I Now Pronounce You...
I'm a Porn Star
I'm a Stripper
I'm Coming Out
Improv Comedy: Tops & Bottoms
In & Out Moments
In the Big House
In the Kitchen with Stefano Faita

J
 Jawbreaker
 Jersey Strong
 Judge Rinder

K
Karma Trekkers
The Kids in the Hall
Kitty 911
Knock Knock Ghost
KoKo Pop

L
The L Word
Ladyboys
The Lair
Lesbian Angels
Leslie Jordan: My Life Down the Pink Carpet
Let's Talk Sex
Locker Room
London Live
Love Handles

M
Make It Raw
Manhunt
Married in Canada
Men's Fashion Insider
Metro Sexual
Metrosexuality
Mile High
Mom vs. Matchmaker
Morgan Brayton and Other People
Mr. Gay Canada
My Mums Used To Be Men
My Family Starring Me
My Trans Journey

N
Naked Attraction
Naked News Daily Male
Neighbours
Never Apart
The New Addams Family
The New Normal
The Next American Gay

O
Operation: Vacation
Out and About
Out for Laughs
Out in the City
Out on TV
Out There
Outlook TV
OUTspoken
OUTspoken Biography

P
Paradise Falls
Pet Shop Boys: A Life in Pop
Pet Shop Boys Live at the O2
Picture This!
Pink Planet
PinkSixty News
The Pinkertons
Politics of the Heart
Positive Youth
Pretty Boys
Pride
Pride Rises
Pride Talks
Psychic Queen
Psycho Kitty

Q
QT: QueerTelevision
Queen City
Queen Live At Wembley Stadium
Queen Rock Montreal
Queer as Folk (North American) 
Queer as Folk (UK)
Queer Life
Queer Nineties
Queer Street
QueerTV

R
The Real Anne Lister
Room Service
Rough or Smooth
Ruckus in Dutchess
RuPaul's Christmas Ball
RuPaul's Drag Race
RuPaul's Drag Race: All Stars
RuPaul's Drag Race: Untucked!
RuPaul's Drag U

S
The Sassy Scoop
Savoir Faire
Schitt's Creek
The Secret Life of Us
Sense Appeal
Setup Squad
Sex & Violence 
Sexplorations
The Shaun Proulx Show
She's Living for This
Shine True
Shout!
Show Me the Monet
Shunned
Slo Pitch
Sloppy Jones
So Gay TV
So Graham Norton
Southern Comfort
Steven & Chris
Straight Talk
Stand Together
Strip Search
Studlebrity
Sugar Rush
Sunday Night at the Palladium
The Switch

T
Tan Lines
A Taste of Life
Teen Angst
This Is Drag
Threesome
Tina Turner Live in Holland
Tipping the Velvet
Tom Daley Goes Global
A Totally Different Me
Transgenders: Pakistan's Open Secret
Two Fat Ladies

U
Under Covers
Under the Pink Carpet
Undercover Egypt
Undressed
Untucked: RuPaul's Drag Race
Urban Fitness
Urban Nites

V
Vancouver Pride Parade - Special Presentation 2013, 2014, 2015

W
WayOutWest.tv
We're Funny That Way!
What's for Dinner?
The Whole Package
Wigs in a Blanket
Wild For The Weekend
Wild Things
Wisecrack
World's Greenest Homes

Y
The Yorkshire Vet

See also

List of television shows with LGBT characters

References

External links
 OUTtv

OUTtv

OUTtv